Secret Invasion is an upcoming American television miniseries created by Kyle Bradstreet for the streaming service Disney+, based on the Marvel Comics storyline of the same name. It is intended to be the ninth television series in the Marvel Cinematic Universe (MCU) produced by Marvel Studios, sharing continuity with the films of the franchise. Bradstreet serves as the head writer.

Samuel L. Jackson reprises his role as Nick Fury from the film series, along with Ben Mendelsohn as Talos, with Cobie Smulders, Kingsley Ben-Adir, Emilia Clarke, Olivia Colman, Martin Freeman, and Don Cheadle also starring. Development of the series began by September 2020, with Bradstreet and Jackson attached. The title and premise of the series, along with Mendelsohn's casting, were revealed that December. Additional castings occurred throughout March and April 2021, followed by the hiring of Thomas Bezucha and Ali Selim to direct the series that May. Filming had begun in London by September 2021, and concluded in late April 2022. Additional filming occurred across West Yorkshire and in Liverpool, England.

Secret Invasion is scheduled to premiere in early 2023, and will consist of six episodes. It will be part of Phase Five of the MCU.

Premise 
A faction of shapeshifting aliens, the Skrulls, have infiltrated all aspects of life on Earth.

Cast and characters 

 Samuel L. Jackson as Nick Fury:The former director of S.H.I.E.L.D. who was working with the Skrulls in deep space for years before returning to Earth. Jackson said the series would delve deeper into Fury's past and future and allowed him to "explore something other than the badassery of who Nick Fury is".
 Ben Mendelsohn as Talos: The leader of a Skrull sect and an ally of Fury.
 Cobie Smulders as Maria Hill:A former high-ranking S.H.I.E.L.D. agent who works closely with Fury but has been out of contact with him. The series allowed Smulders to show more depth to Hill than in her previous appearances.
 Kingsley Ben-Adir as Gravik: The leader of a group of rebel Skrulls.
 Emilia Clarke as Abigail Brand
 Olivia Colman as Sonya Falsworth: A special agent who is an old ally of Fury's.
 Martin Freeman as Everett K. Ross: A former agent of the Central Intelligence Agency.
 Don Cheadle as James "Rhodey" Rhodes: An officer in the U.S. Air Force and Avenger who operates the War Machine armor.

Additionally, Dermot Mulroney is expected to appear as United States President Ritson, while Killian Scott, Christopher McDonald, Carmen Ejogo, and Charlayne Woodard have been cast in undisclosed roles.

Episodes 

The series will consist of six episodes, directed by Thomas Bezucha and Ali Selim. The directors will either split the episodes evenly, or one will direct four episodes and the other two.

Production

Development 
In September 2020, Kyle Bradstreet was revealed to be developing a television series for the streaming service Disney+ centered on the Marvel Comics character Nick Fury. The character had previously been one of ten properties announced in September 2005 by Marvel Entertainment chairman and CEO Avi Arad as being developed for film by the newly formed studio Marvel Studios, after Marvel received financing to produce the slate of films to be distributed by Paramount Pictures; Andrew W. Marlowe was hired to write a script for a Nick Fury film in April 2006. In April 2019, after Samuel L. Jackson had portrayed Nick Fury in ten Marvel Cinematic Universe (MCU) films as well as the Marvel Television series Agents of S.H.I.E.L.D., Richard Newby from The Hollywood Reporter felt it was time the character received his own film, calling the character "the MCU's most powerful asset yet to be fully untapped". Jackson was attached to reprise his role in Bradstreet's series, with the latter writing and serving as executive producer.

In December 2020, Marvel Studios President Kevin Feige officially announced a new series titled Secret Invasion, with Jackson co-starring with Ben Mendelsohn in his MCU role of Talos. The series is based on the 2008–09 comic book storyline of the same name, with Feige describing it as a "crossover event series" that would tie-in with future MCU films; the series' premise further described it as a crossover event series. Marvel Studios chose to make a Secret Invasion series instead of a film because it allowed them to do something different than they had done before. Directors were being lined up for the series by April 2021, with Thomas Bezucha and Ali Selim attached a month later. Marvel Studios' Feige, Louis D'Esposito, Brad Winderbaum, and Jonathan Schwartz also serve as executive producers. The series will consist of six 40–50 minute episodes.

Writing 
Feige said the series would not be looking to match the scope of the Secret Invasion comic book storyline, in terms of the number of characters featured or the impact on the wider universe, and noted that the comic book featured more characters than the crossover film Avengers: Endgame (2019). Instead, he described Secret Invasion as a showcase for Jackson and Mendelsohn that would explore the political paranoia elements of the Secret Invasion comic series "that was great with the twists and turns that that took". Feige said the series would serve as a follow-up to the story of Captain Marvel alongside its sequel The Marvels (2023), but was tonally different from that film. Jackson said the series would uncover some of the things that happened during the Blip. Cobie Smulders described the series as "a very grounded, on-this-earth drama" that was "dealing with real human issues and dealing with trust".

Casting 
Jackson was expected to reprise his role in the series with the reveal of its development in September 2020. When the series was officially announced that December, Feige confirmed Jackson's casting and announced that Mendelsohn would co-star. Kingsley Ben-Adir was cast as the Skrull Gravik, the "lead villain" role, in March 2021, and the following month, Olivia Colman was cast as Sonya Falsworth, along with Emilia Clarke as Abigail Brand, and Killian Scott in an undisclosed role. In May 2021, Christopher McDonald joined the cast as a newly created character, rather than one from the comics, who had the potential to appear in other MCU series and films. Carmen Ejogo had joined the cast by November 2021, and the next month, Smulders was set to reprise her MCU role as Maria Hill. In February 2022, set photos revealed that Don Cheadle would appear in his MCU role of James "Rhodey" Rhodes, along with Dermot Mulroney as United States President Ritson. The following month, Jackson confirmed that Martin Freeman and Cheadle would appear in the series, with Freeman reprising his MCU role as Everett K. Ross. In September 2022, it was revealed that Charlayne Woodard was cast in the series.

In September 2021, Chloe Bennet, who portrayed Daisy Johnson / Quake in Agents of S.H.I.E.L.D., stated that she was not involved in the series, after "rampant speculation" suggested she would be, given the character's prominence in the Marvel Comics story and that Bennet was no longer attached to the live-action Powerpuff Girls pilot by August 2021 because of scheduling conflicts with another project.

Design 
Frank Walsh serves as production designer, while Claire Anderson serves as costume designer.

Filming 
Filming had begun by September 1, 2021, in London, under the working title Jambalaya, with Bezucha and Selim directing the series, and Sylvaine Dufaux and Remi Adefarasin serving as cinematographers. Filming was previously expected to begin in mid-August 2021. Jackson began filming his scenes on October 14, after already working on The Marvels which was filming in London at the same time. Filming occurred in West Yorkshire, England, including Leeds on January 22, Huddersfield on January 24, and in Halifax at Piece Hall from January 24 to 31, 2022. Filming occurred at the Liverpool Street station on February 28, 2022. Filming wrapped on April 25, 2022. Additional filming was also expected to occur across Europe.

Jackson revealed in mid-June 2022 that he would return to London in August to work on reshoots for Secret Invasion, after doing the same for The Marvels. McDonald was returning to London by the end of July for the reshoots, which he said were to make the series "better" and to go "much deeper than before". He also indicated that a new writer was brought on to the production to work on the additional material. Jackson completed his reshoots by August 12, 2022, while Clarke filmed scenes in London at the end of September. Eben Bolter served as the cinematographer during additional photography which lasted for four months.

Post-production 
James Stanger and Melissa Lawson Cheung serve as editors.

Music 
In February 2023, Kris Bowers was revealed to be composing for the series, and was working on the score at that time.

Marketing 
The first footage of the series debuted on Disney+ Day on November 12, 2021. More footage was shown in July 2022 at San Diego Comic-Con. Adam B. Vary of Variety said the footage had an "overall vibe... of paranoia and foreboding", believing the series would fit with the larger "anti-heroic thread" building in Phase Five of the MCU. The first trailer for the series debuted at the 2022 D23 Expo in September 2022. Polygon Austen Goslin felt the trailer was "mostly a recap of the series' plot", while Vanity Fairs Anthony Breznican noted how Fury had both eyes and said he "appears to be done relying on others to help save the world". Tamera Jones from Collider felt the trailer was "action-packed with explosions and intrigue, giving off more of a spy vibe than a fun paranoid mystery".

Release 
Secret Invasion is scheduled to premiere on Disney+ in early 2023, and will consist of six episodes. It will be part of Phase Five of the MCU.

Future 
In September 2022, Feige stated that Secret Invasion would lead into Armor Wars, with Cheadle set to reprise his role as Rhodes.

References

External links 
  at Marvel.com
 
 

American action adventure television series
American spy thriller television series

Alien invasions in television
Disney+ original programming
English-language television shows
Espionage television series
Marvel Cinematic Universe: Phase Five television series
Marvel Cinematic Universe crossovers
Superhero crossover television shows
Television series about shapeshifting
Television series based on works by Brian Michael Bendis
Television series by Marvel Studios
Television shows filmed in England
Television shows shot in London
Upcoming television series